Van Nuys is a neighborhood in the San Fernando Valley of the city of Los Angeles, California.

Van Nuys may also refer to:

People
 Edgar Van Nuys Allen (1900–1961), American doctor
 Frederick Van Nuys (1874–1944), United States Senator
 Isaac Newton Van Nuys (1836–1912), American businessman, farmer and rancher, namesake of the Los Angeles neighborhood
 James Van Nuys, American artist who created statues for Rapid City, South Dakota
 Laura Bower Van Nuys, author of the memoir that was the basis of the 1968 Disney film The One and Only, Genuine, Original Family Band

Fictional
 Bethany Van Nuys, a character in the American TV series Mad Men
 Patricia Van Nuys, character played by Dorothy Gish in the 1920 American silent film Flying Pat
 Robert Van Nuys, character played by James Rennie in the 1920 American silent film Flying Pat

Places
 Van Nuys, a neighborhood of San Fernando Valley in Los Angeles, California, U.S.
 Van Nuys Boulevard, a major arterial road through the central San Fernando Valley
 Van Nuys, Indiana, an unincorporated community in Henry County, Indiana, U.S.
 Vanuys, Sherwood Forest, Memphis, Tennessee, U.S.
 Byzantine Catholic Eparchy of Van Nuys of the Byzantine Catholic Church, in California, U.S.

Facilities and structures
Van Nuys station, a train station in Van Nuys, L.A., California, U.S.
Van Nuys station (Los Angeles Metro), a bus station in Van Nuys, L.A., California, U.S.
Van Nuys/San Fernando station, a light rail station in Pacoima, L.A., California, U.S.
Van Nuys Airport (ICAO: KVNY; IATA: VNY), Van Nuys, L.A., California, U.S.
Van Nuys High School, Van Nuys, L.A., California, U.S.
Van Nuys Assembly, a GM automotive factory in Van Nuys, L.A., California, U.S.
 Van Nuys Farm, a historic home and farm in Johnson County, Indiana, U.S.

Entertainment
 Van Nuys Blvd. (film), a 1979 American comedy
 "Van Nuys", an episode of Law & Order: LA, an American TV series
 "Van Nuys", an episode of American TV series Weeds
 "Van Nuys", a song on the 2007 album The Heroin Diaries Soundtrack by Sixx:A.M.

Other
 SS I. N. Van Nuys, a Liberty ship launched in 1944

See also

 
 
 Nuy (disambiguation)